WDRB (channel 41) is a television station in Louisville, Kentucky, United States, affiliated with the Fox network. It is owned by Block Communications alongside Salem, Indiana–licensed dual CW/MyNetworkTV affiliate WBKI (channel 58). Both stations share studios on West Muhammad Ali Boulevard (near US 150) in downtown Louisville, while WDRB's transmitter is located in rural northeastern Floyd County, Indiana (northeast of Floyds Knobs).

History

As an independent station
The first construction permit for channel 41 in Louisville was issued in 1953 to Robert Rounsaville, owner of WLOU (1350 AM), Louisville's first Black-oriented radio station. The station, if built, would have been the first Black-oriented TV station in the country. However, the construction of WQXL-TV depended on the success of the first of three planned stations, Atlanta's WQXI-TV, which failed and left the air in 1955. The permit remained active for several more years; the call letters were changed to WTAM-TV, and in 1963 the permit was sold to Producers, Inc., of Evansville, Indiana, but no station ever materialized. Producers was related to the Polaris Corporation, which in Louisville owned WKYW (900 AM).

On July 7, 1965, Consolidated Broadcasting Company, a group of five people from Chillicothe, Missouri with no television station experience (but were eventually shareholders for what would become ill-fated Kansas City independent station KCIT-TV), filed for a construction permit for the channel. The permit was granted on April 20, 1966, but it would be nearly five years before any station came to air. Antenna height issues and permitting setbacks caused delays for the new WDRB-TV and for a channel 21 permittee. Approval was finally obtained that summer, and Consolidated renovated a building that had housed a lithograph studio on East Main Street in the Butchertown neighborhood to serve as WDRB-TV's studios.

WDRB-TV finally signed on the air on February 28, 1971, becoming the first independent station in the Louisville market. Initially, the station signed on at 3:00 p.m. on weekdays; its programming included low-budget afternoon children's programming and occasional news updates provided by anchor Wilson Hatcher, and, most notably, the Saturday night horror film strand Fright Night, hosted by local theater actor Charlie Kissinger. Not long after going on air, WDRB-TV debuted an afternoon children's program, "Presto the Magic Clown", hosted by Bill "Presto" Dopp. The station was profitable within months and tied then-ABC affiliate WLKY-TV in the ratings.

By 1976, WDRB-TV carried a mix of cartoons, westerns, outdoor shows and classic movies. The station's original owners sold the station for $6.5 million to the Minneapolis Star & Tribune Company (which later became the Cowles Media Company) in 1977. By that year, the station expanded its broadcast day to 11:00 a.m., with the addition of a four-hour block of religious programs; by 1979, WDRB-TV began signing on daily at 7:00 a.m.

In 1980, the station moved from Butchertown to its present location on Muhammad Ali Boulevard. However, WDRB-TV would eventually pull out of a contest for something it had sought since December 1977; a move from channel 41 to channel 21. In 1981, an administrative law judge had denied the application and preferred the competing bid from the Word Broadcasting Network, only for the FCC review board to overturn the decision.

Cowles exited television in the early 1980s. After selling its only other station, KTVH in Hutchinson, Kansas, it sold WDRB to Block Communications of Toledo, Ohio for $10 million in 1983. Under Block, WDRB-TV dropped the channel 21 application, clearing the way for WBNA to launch. Block began to increase WDRB's profile in the market by acquiring higher-rated and more recent off-network sitcoms and dramas to its schedule, along with a focus on the broadcast rights for the burgeoning athletic programs of the University of Louisville's Cardinals, which the station won in 1985 and held for two years.

As a Fox affiliate
On October 9, 1986, WDRB-TV became an affiliate of the Fox network and became known as "Fox 41" in late 1989. WDRB-TV became one of two Fox affiliates serving the Louisville market in 1990, when Campbellsville-based WGRB (channel 34, later CW affiliate WBKI-TV) affiliated with the network. Channel 34 served the southern portions of the market before it moved its transmitter farther north to service more of the market; WDRB became the sole Fox station in Louisville when WGRB became affiliated with The WB in 1997.

During the 1990s, WDRB shifted away from running older movies and classic sitcoms in favor of acquiring more talk and reality shows. In 1990, the station also regained rights to Louisville athletics in 1990 after the university spent three years with WHAS-TV and upgraded its transmitter, improving signal coverage. In 1994, Block Communications entered into a local marketing agreement to operate Salem, Indiana-based WFTE (channel 58, later WMYO, now WBKI); Block acquired WFTE outright in 2001, creating the first television station duopoly in the Louisville market. WDRB continued to carry cartoons through Fox Kids throughout the 1990s; the Fox Kids weekday afternoon lineup was discontinued at the end of 2001, when the remaining Saturday block moved to channel 58 until its successor 4KidsTV was discontinued by Fox in November 2008.

On April 21, 2007, WDRB became the first television station in Louisville to televise the Kentucky Derby Festival's all-day "Thunder Over Louisville" air and fireworks show in high definition—which, at the time, was one of the largest technical undertakings ever attempted by an American television station. This was followed by a second—even more elaborate—"Thunder" telecast in HD in April 2008.

The station began phasing out the "Fox 41" branding in favor of simply branding by the WDRB call letters in May 2011. While this occurred shortly after sister station KTRV-TV in Boise, Idaho unexpectedly lost its Fox affiliation, station management stated that the rebrand was done in order to bring its branding in line with Louisville's other major network stations–NBC affiliate WAVE (channel 3), ABC affiliate WHAS-TV (channel 11) and CBS affiliate WLKY (channel 32)–who have all long branded with their call letters. Additionally, station management wanted to distinguish the station from Fox News Channel; WDRB is one of a handful of Fox affiliates that omit network references in their branding.

In early 2011, the master control operations for WDRB and WMYO were upgraded to allow the transmission of syndicated and locally produced programs in high definition; it also upgraded its severe weather ticker seen on both stations to be overlaid on HD programming without having to downconvert the content to standard definition.

On June 1, 2012, WDRB, WMYO and their respective subchannels were pulled from Insight Communications, what was then the market's major cable provider, as Block was unable to come to terms on a new retransmission consent agreement with Time Warner Cable (which purchased Insight in February 2012, but had not yet rebranded those systems under the latter until in 2013). The affected stations were restored on June 6, 2012, as a result of a new carriage agreement between Block and TWC.

In May 2013, WDRB began construction of an additional  of space at its Muhammad Ali Boulevard studio facility, including an expanded newsroom and sales area; the addition of two conference rooms; offices for finance and editing departments; and the addition of a secondary studio to be used for commercial and station projects. The $1.7 million expanded facility opened on May 5, 2014; as a result of the expansion, sister station WBKI-TV relocated their employees from that station's offices in the Kaden Tower into the WDRB facility.

Programming
In addition to carrying the entire Fox programming schedule, syndicated programs broadcast by WDRB include Live with Kelly and Ryan, Rachael Ray, Judge Judy and Dr. Phil.

Sports programming
Currently, all sports programming is provided by the network. However, for many years, WDRB had rights to University of Louisville Cardinals football and men's basketball games, some of which were syndicated through the Lorimar Sports Network or Raycom Sports packages of Metro Conference basketball games from the 1980s until the Metro Conference merger with the Great Midwest Conference to create Conference USA in 1995.

WDRB also previously broadcast some University of Kentucky Wildcats basketball games at some point during the 1990s.

News operation
WDRB presently broadcasts 57½ hours of locally produced newscasts each week (with 9½ hours each weekday and five hours each on Saturdays and Sundays); in regards to the number of hours devoted to news programming, it is the highest local newscast output among the broadcast television stations in the Louisville market and in the Commonwealth of Kentucky.

After more than a year of planning, WDRB launched its news department on March 12, 1990, with the debut of a half-hour 10:00 p.m. newscast originally titled The News at 10. Many longtime news personalities in the Louisville market joined the new WDRB news staff when the station formed its news operation; many others have joined channel 41 from other stations since that time. The News at 10 was originally anchored by Lauretta Harris (who joined WDRB from WAVE), Jim Mitchell (who started in the market at WHAS-TV, before moving to WAVE), meteorologist Tammy Garrison, and sports anchor David Sullivan.

In 1995, the program was retitled as Fox News at 10 and expanded to one hour and added weekend editions on Saturday and Sunday evenings. Bill Francis (formerly of WLKY) and Susan Sweeney (formerly with radio station WHAS (840 AM)) joined the staff as anchors of the weekend newscasts; Tara Bassett (who had previously worked at WAVE) was the weekend weather anchor. The station launched additional newscasts on its schedule as its ratings position in the market strengthened: the first news expansion outside its established 10:00 slot came on October 5, 1998, when WDRB premiered the three-hour-long Fox in the Morning and a half-hour midday newscast at 11:30 a.m. (originally titled Fox First News); the latter program expanded to an hour on September 21, 2015, with the addition of a half-hour noon newscast. This was later followed by the debut of an hour-long 4:00 p.m. newscast in September 2001.

In June 2002, WDRB became one of the few U.S. television stations to run a regular editorial segment, when it debuted "Point of View", a twice-weekly segment that is usually hosted by WDRB/WMYO president and general manager Bill Lamb; the segment introduced a weekly feature with viewer responses to the discussed topic via phone message in 2007. "Point of View" has evolved into one of the community's most prominent opinion forums, featuring frequent guest editorials by a wide array of community members. In 2006, WDRB—in partnership with Norton Healthcare—became the first and only station in Louisville to offer real-time closed captioning on all of its newscasts, making 100% of the station's news content available to over 147,000 deaf or hard of hearing viewers in the market. Prior to this, only pre-written studio-originated content was closed-captioned, while live field reports and breaking news stories were not transcribed.

On April 17, 2010, WDRB became the second television station in Louisville market (after WAVE) to begin broadcasting its local newscasts in high definition; it was the first (and presently, the only) television station in the market to provide news video from the field in true high definition, as WDRB upgraded its ENG vehicles, satellite truck, studio and field cameras and other equipment in order to broadcast news footage from the field in high definition, in addition to segments broadcast from the main studio. By comparison at the time, WAVE only broadcast studio segments in HD, while field reports are presented in widescreen standard definition, while WHAS-TV and WLKY were still broadcasting in SD, stretched to fill 16:9 widescreen sets.

On January 17, 2011, WDRB launched a half-hour early evening newscast at 6:30 p.m. each weeknight (it is the only station in the United States that currently airs newscasts during the 4:00 and 6:30 p.m. timeslots); the program expanded to an hour-long broadcast on September 22, 2014, with the addition of a half-hour newscast at 6:00. WDRB began producing a half-hour weeknight 7:00 p.m. newscast on WBKI-TV on September 17, 2012; this was the result of a local marketing agreement that was forged between Block and WBKI-TV owner LM Communications, LLC (as such, WDRB is one of only a handful of Fox stations that produce a newscast for another station in the same market, among which include KCPQ in Seattle (which produces a 9:00 p.m. newscast for sister station KZJO) and KTVU in San Francisco (which produces a 7:00 p.m. newscast for sister station KICU-TV)); the WBKI newscast was canceled on September 19, 2015. On January 26, 2013, the station debuted a three-hour weekend morning newscast, airing Saturdays and Sundays from 6:00 to 9:00 a.m. On May 7, 2019, it was announced that WDRB had hired long-time WAVE anchor Scott Reynolds to anchor a new hour-long 5:00 p.m. newscast starting in September 2019.

In June 2013, WDRB gained notice in the television industry when it debuted a promo criticizing the broad, constant and generalized use of the term "breaking news" by other news stations (both within the Louisville market and around the United States), stating that "breaking news" has been overused as a "marketing ploy" by other stations, who tend to apply the term to stories that are low in urgency and/or relevance. To coincide with the promo, WDRB posted on its website a "contract" outline of its journalism practices with its viewers and advertisers, with the former list promising to judiciously use "breaking news" (applying the term to stories that are "both 'breaking' and "news'"), as well as a general promise to deliver news in a truthful, balanced and informative manner, and without overt hype and sensationalism.

June 2019 saw Bill Lamb departing the station after his successes with WDRB, and becoming the general manager of Fox Television Stations' West Coast flagship duopoly of KTTV and KCOP-TV. Ricky Joseph from fellow Block station WAND will serve as an interim president/GM until Lamb's replacement is found.

The station gained national attention in November 2019 for a sweeps interview with the founder of Papa John's Pizza, John Schnatter (who had been a controversial local figure since his July 2018 ouster over use of a racial slur on a conference call). Schnatter had made the claim to WDRB's Stephan Johnson that he had found the quality control of the chain had declined after saying he ordered forty pizzas to eat from it in a month long period, and warned of a 'day of reckoning' for company board member Mark Shapiro for participating in Schnatter's ouster from the company.

Technical information

Subchannels
This station's digital signal is multiplexed:

In late 2010, Block Communications began testing digital subchannels on both WDRB and WMYO; on or about January 30, 2011, WDRB began carrying the Tribune Broadcasting-owned Antenna TV network over its second digital subchannel. WDRB-DT2 was added to Insight Communications systems in the area on digital channel 187 on April 20, 2011. On March 1, 2017, WDRB added a third digital subchannel carrying Ion Television on WDRB-DT3, after previous affiliate WBNA became an independent station, and eventually upgraded it to Ion's default 720p high-definition presentation (with the added advantage of few to no preemptions of Ion programming, which WBNA did regularly).

Analog-to-digital conversion
WDRB discontinued regular programming on its analog signal, over UHF channel 41, on June 12, 2009, the official date in which full-power television stations in the United States transitioned from analog to digital broadcasts under federal mandate. The station's digital signal remained on its pre-transition UHF channel 49. Through the use of PSIP, digital television receivers display the station's virtual channel as its former UHF analog channel 41.

Out-of-market coverage

Frankfort and the Bluegrass region
WDRB had previously been carried on many cable systems in areas adjacent to the Louisville market, including Kentucky's capital city, Frankfort. The channel was the first one sequentially on Frankfort's channel lineup (on channel 2), and was the sole source for Fox programming in HD in the capital city until 2012. On January 1, 2012, WDRB was removed from most cable systems outside of the market as a result of a corporate directive from Fox as part of its new affiliation agreement that forbade WDRB from being distributed on providers outside of its home market to protect ratings for the network's affiliates in nearby markets; this rule has been a source of conflict in several other markets, which have had out-of-market Fox affiliates from adjacent areas pulled from local cable providers. A few months later, the station removed the county outlines of Anderson and Franklin counties in Kentucky (the westernmost counties in the Lexington television market) and Switzerland County in Indiana (within the Cincinnati television market) from weather maps and severe weather alert displays; as a result, WDRB became the only Louisville area station that did not recognize Frankfort as being part of its viewing area. Despite this, Frankfort and Lawrenceburg are still occasionally mentioned during on-air weather segments. On December 20, 2017, the main cable provider in Frankfort, the Frankfort Plant Board, announced WDRB's return to their channel lineup, mainly for local news coverage, in 2018. Beginning sometime in April, WDRB returned on channels 4 and 504 in HD providing local news and syndicated programming while replacing Fox network programming with a cropped simulcast of Antenna TV from WDRB-DT2. At the same time, FPB began carrying the Antenna TV feed from WDRB-DT2 outright on channel 28, replacing the feed from WLJC-DT3 which had, in turn, replaced WTVQ-DT6 in early 2018 when Lexington's Antenna TV affiliation moved. WDRB was removed once again on January 1, 2021 after FPB and WDRB were unable to come to an agreement to continue carriage of the station, though this disagreement was based on financial differences rather than a network rule.

South-central Kentucky
From 1987 to 1992, and from 2001 to 2006, WDRB had also been one of the two default Fox affiliates for Bowling Green media market area, especially in the years after that area's original Fox affiliate WNKY lost its affiliation and replaced it with NBC in 2001. In the eastern half of that market area, WDRB was carried on the Glasgow Electric Plant Board and South Central Rural Telephone Cooperative's cable systems, despite the Glasgow area being in closer proximity to the viewing area of Nashville affiliate WZTV. However, in September 2006, the Bowling Green area's ABC affiliate WBKO launched a second digital subchannel to serve as a Fox affiliate. As a result, blackouts of Fox programming by WBKO-DT2 were common, as was the blackouts of ABC programming from WHAS-TV were caused by WBKO's main channel. SCRTC and Glasgow EPB both dropped WDRB, WDRB-DT2 and WMYO in January 2015, with WDRB's main channel being dropped due to the presence of Fox affiliate WBKO-DT2; WMYO and WDRB-DT2 were respectively replaced by WCZU-LD, which began operations the previous year as an upstart station serving as a primary MyNetworkTV and secondary Antenna TV affiliate. Both WBKO-DT2 and WCZU-LD (the latter of which is now a Court TV affiliate) claimed exclusivity in terms of Fox, Antenna TV and MyNetworkTV affiliates on the Glasgow-based cable systems. Today, WDNZ-LD currently holds the MyNetworkTV and Antenna TV affiliations in Bowling Green. 

WDRB remains available to Mediacom customers in Hart and Metcalfe counties.

Owensboro area
In parts of the Evansville, Indiana market, WDRB is also available on Charter Spectrum channel 70 in the Owensboro and Henderson areas, as well as on Crystal Broadband Networks in Lewisport.

References

External links
 
 Fright Night program info

1971 establishments in Kentucky
Antenna TV affiliates
Fox network affiliates
Ion Television affiliates
Scripps News affiliates
television channels and stations established in 1971
DRB